LCT may refer to:

Science

Biology
Lysosomal cystine transporter family
Long-chain triglyceride
LCT gene, a gene that encodes the enzyme lactase

Chemistry
Lower consolute temperature, the critical temperature below which the components of a mixture are miscible for all compositions

Mathematics and computers
Limit comparison test, for series convergence
Linear canonical transformation, an integral transform
Link/cut tree, a data structure for maintaining dynamic trees

Transportation
Lake Champlain Transportation Company, US
Lane Cove Tunnel, a toll road in Sydney, Australia
Lorain County Transit, Ohio, US
Luxury Car Tax, Australia
the ICAO airline code for TAR Aerolineas

Other uses
Labour Congress of Thailand
Landing craft tank
Language and Communication Technologies
LCT resort, Busan, South Korea
Ligue Communiste des Travailleurs, former Senegal political party
Local Civil time
Low-carbon technology (disambiguation)